The Seehorn is a mountain, in the Berchtesgaden Alps, in the Pinzgau region of Austria, not far from the border between the Austrian state of Salzburg and Bavaria in Germany.

Location 
The Seehorn lies at the eastern end of the Weißbach valley and north of the Dießbachl valley near Lofer. Below and to the west are the lakes of Seehornsee and the Dießbach Reservoir. On the arête between the two valleys west of the Seehorn is the Kallbrunnalm, one of the largest alms in the Berchtesgaden Alps.

To the north rises the Hochkalter, to the northeast, the Watzmann, to the east, the Großer Hundstod and, to the northwest, the Hocheisspitze.

References

External links 

Two-thousanders of Austria
Mountains of the Alps
Berchtesgaden Alps